The 2019 Girls' Youth Pan-American Volleyball Cup was played from May 19 to May 27, 2019 in Durango, Mexico. Eight teams competed in this tournament. Peru won the tournament for the first time defeating Puerto Rico. Since Peru had already qualified for the 2019 World Championship through the South American Championship, Puerto Rico and Mexico qualified instead. Janelly Ceopa of Peru was named the tournament MVP.

Competing nations

Squads

Preliminary round
All times are in Peru Standard Time (UTC−05:00)

Group A

|}

Group B

Final round

Championship bracket

Classification 5–8

Quarterfinals

Semifinals

Seventh place match

Fifth place match

Bronze medal match

Final

Final standing

Yadhira Anchant,
Carolina Takahash,
Sarita Ceopa ,
Nicolle Perez,
Maria  Lopez ,
Francesca Calderon ,
Yohmara Rivera ,
Brunella Milla ,
Lizanyela Lopez ,
Antuanett Garcia,
Alondra Alarcon,
Thaisa Leod

Individual awards

Most Valuable Player
 
Best Scorer
 
Best Setter
 
Best Opposite
 
Best Outside Hitters
 
 
Best Middle Blockers
 
 
Best Libero
 
Best Server
 
Best Receiver
 
Best Digger

References

External links
Official Website
Regulations
Summary of Stats
Final bulletin

Women's Pan-American Volleyball Cup
Youth Pan-American Volleyball Cup
Girls Youth Pan American Volleyball Cup
Volleyball
May 2019 sports events in Mexico